This is a list of NUTS2 statistical regions of Romania by Human Development Index as of 2021.

References 

Romania

Romania
Human Development Index